Mohammad Taan Reda (born 30 December 1972), commonly known as Michael Reda, is a former professional association football player who played as a midfielder. Born in Australia, Reda represented Lebanon at the 2000 AFC Asian Cup.

Club career
In 2000, Reda moved to Fairfield Bulls on loan.

International career
Reda has played for Lebanon internationally, most notably making appearance for Lebanon at the 2000 AFC Asian Cup. He played for the School Sport Australia Football team in Singapore, Malaysia and Brunei in January 1991.

Honours
Parramatta
 NSL Cup: 1993–94; runner-up: 1992–93
 NSL Challenge Cup: 1994

Adelaide City
 National Soccer League: 1993–94

Wollongong Wolves
 Waratah Cup: 1997

Melbourne Knights
 Tynan Eyre Cup runner-up: 1998, 1999

Olympic Beirut
 Lebanese Premier League: 2002–03
 Lebanese FA Cup: 2002–03

See also
 List of Lebanon international footballers born outside Lebanon

References

External links
 
 

1972 births
Living people
Australian people of Lebanese descent
Lebanese footballers
Soccer players from Melbourne
Association football midfielders
National Soccer League (Australia) players
APIA Leichhardt FC players
Parramatta FC players
Rockdale Ilinden FC players
Adelaide City FC players
Gippsland Falcons players
Wollongong Wolves FC players
Melbourne Knights FC players
Lebanese Premier League players
Homenetmen Beirut footballers
Olympic Beirut players
Lebanon international footballers
2000 AFC Asian Cup players
Australian soccer players